Phalaenopsis robinsonii is a species of orchid native to Maluku, Indonesia. The specific epithet robinsonii refers to the botanist and collector of the type specimen Charles Budd Robinson (1871-1913).

Description
It is a pendulous epiphyte with 4–5, up to 31 cm long and 5.7 cm wide leaves. Fleshy, white flowers with lilac spots are produced on few-flowered, arching, branched or unbranched inflorescences. The lateral lobes of the labellum are unusually small.

Taxonomy
This species is placed in the section Amboinenses of subgenus Polychilos. An affinity to Phalaenopsis amboinensis or Phalaenopsis modesta has been reported.

References

robinsonii
Orchids of Indonesia
Epiphytic orchids